Cântec batrânesc is a traditional form of ballad which originates from Romania.  It is similar to an epic poem and it is one of the most typical genres of Romanian literature.

Origin 

The name comes from the Latin word ballare, meaning "dancing".  Both terms were entailed by the Romanian poet Vasile Alecsandri.  However, the usual term for this form of ballad is still epic song.

Notes 

Being a folkloric genre, the ballad has specific notes of folkloric literature:

 is anonymous
 is oral and collective (is transmitted from generation to generation)
 is syncretic (represents the contribution of many artistic patterns, like sung poetry, carols, incantations, etc.

Ballads are epic creations in which the next themes are brought out:

 the outlaw's actions
 historical events 
 bravery of the hero
 human behavior

The characters have almighty features, presented in antithesis, being the opposite of each other.

Themes 

 love
 the good and the bad
 the hankering, the longing
 the immolation for the creation
 the connection between humans and the nature
 the revolt, the riots
 the irreversibility of time

Myths in epic songs 

 the immolation for the creation
 the erotic myth (the myth illustrates how girls at puberty long for the unknown feeling of love, which comes unexpectedly and makes them feel something very deep and spontaneous)
 the formation of the Romanian collectivity
 the transhumance myth (human attitude towards death)

References

Romanian music
Ballads
Song forms